Harry DeWolf-class offshore patrol vessels are warships of the Royal Canadian Navy (RCN) built within the Government of Canada Arctic and Offshore Patrol Ship (AOPS) procurement project, part of the National Shipbuilding Procurement Strategy (now called National Shipbuilding Strategy). In July 2007 the federal government announced plans for acquiring six to eight icebreaking warships for the RCN.

The vessels are modelled on the Norwegian  and as of 2007 were projected to cost  to construct with a total project procurement budgeted to cost $4.3 billion in order to cover maintenance over the 25-year lifespan of the vessels. In 2018 it was reported that the cost of the first six ships had increased by $810 million over previous projections. In 2023 it was reported that the cost for the first six ships had increased by a further $780 million and that of the two envisaged vessels for the Coast Guard by an additional $100 million.

Construction of the ships Harry DeWolf and  started in September 2015 and September 2016 at Halifax Shipyards, respectively. Harry DeWolf and Margaret Brooke were originally planned to be delivered in 2019 and 2020 respectively. Harry DeWolf was officially launched on 15 September 2018. Max Bernays was launched in October 2021, and was expected to be followed by William Hall in 2022.  was scheduled to begin construction in 2019, with construction on  expected to begin in 2021. They were originally planned to be completed by 2022 and 2023, respectively. However, in 2020 it was confirmed that ships five and six (Frédérick Rolette and Robert Hampton Gray) would not begin construction until 2021 and 2022 respectively.

On 22 May 2019, an official announcement was made to begin the process of building two vessels for the Canadian Coast Guard, bringing the total number of ships in the class to eight.

Project history
In 2006 Prime Minister Stephen Harper had spoken about building three to four icebreakers capable of travelling through thick ice in the Arctic Ocean. In 2007 it was announced that the Canadian Armed Forces would purchase six to eight patrol ships having an ice class of Polar Class 5, meaning that they were capable of limited ice breaking, based on the Norwegian Svalbard class. This announcement was met with some controversy, and the proposed ships have been called "slush-breakers", by Dr. Gary Stern, a scientist aboard , and Jack Layton of the NDP. However, it was notable that in 2005 of the nineteen Canadian Coast Guard icebreakers then in service, only six had an ice class higher than Polar Class 5.

In 2010 the Arctic and Offshore Patrol Ship Project was grouped with several other federal government ship procurement projects for the Royal Canadian Navy and Canadian Coast Guard into the National Shipbuilding Procurement Strategy (NSPS). The NSPS announced on 19 October 2011 that Irving Shipbuilding would be awarded the $25 billion contract to build six to eight Arctic patrol ships as well as fifteen other warships for the RCN over the next two decades.

In September 2014, Prime Minister Stephen Harper announced that the name of the first ship in the class would be Harry DeWolf, named in honour of wartime Canadian naval hero Harry DeWolf, and that the class would be named the Harry DeWolf class. In December it was found that not enough money had been projected to cover the cost of building the six to eight planned ships and that the budget would need to be increased, delaying the signing of the contract. However, in an effort to drive down costs, Irving Shipbuilding could only project building five ships with the option to build a sixth only if it came under budget. The budget for the project was increased from $3.1 billion to $3.5 billion to ensure a cash buffer. However, by 2018 that approach had been abandoned and the budget for the first six ships had reportedly increased to $4.3 billion.

On 13 April 2015 the government announced a second ship would be named Margaret Brooke in honour of Sub-Lieutenant Margaret Brooke, a Royal Canadian Navy Nursing Sister decorated for heroism for her efforts to save a fellow nursing sister after the sinking of the ferry  during World War II. The fourth ship will be named for William Hall, a Victoria Cross (VC) recipient from Nova Scotia and the first black person to be awarded the VC, for his actions during the Siege of Lucknow. The fifth ship will be named for Frédérick Rolette, a French-Canadian sailor of Canada's Provincial Marine under the Royal Navy who, during the War of 1812, was second-in-command of the ship  at the Battle of Lake Erie, and led the capture of the American supply vessel Cayahoga Packet, in July 1812, an action instrumental in contributing to the capture of Detroit one month later.

On 2 November 2018, the option for the sixth ship was taken up. In 2020 it was confirmed that the sixth ship would be named for Robert Hampton Gray, posthumously awarded the Victoria Cross for gallantry during World War II while serving with the Royal Navy's Fleet Air Arm in the Pacific theatre. The cost of the sixth vessel is expected to be higher due to the tariffs on steel and aluminum imposed by both Canada and the United States.

On 22 May 2019, it was be announced two more ships will be built for the Canadian Coast Guard.

Construction

On 18 June 2015 it was reported that the construction of test modules for the lead ship of the class Harry DeWolf was underway. The first sections of keel were placed on 11 March 2016, but the official laying of the keel of Harry DeWolf was held on 9 June 2016, marking the first naval construction in Canada since 1998, and the largest purposefully-built warship for the RCN in over 50 years.  In September 2016, it was announced that construction had begun on Margaret Brooke and that 50 of 64 modular pieces of Harry DeWolf had been completed. On 8 December 2017, the three main sections of Harry DeWolf were fitted into place. The first steel for Max Bernays was cut on 19 December 2017.  Construction of William Hall started on 3 May 2019. Margaret Brooke was launched on 10 November 2019. First steel was cut for the fifth ship, Frédérick Rolette, in May 2021 and for sixth ship, Robert Hampton Gray, in August 2022.

During the COVID-19 pandemic, Irving Shipbuilding announced that construction would be halted for at least three weeks beginning in March 2020. Harry DeWolf was delivered to the Navy in July 2020, and commissioned on June 26, 2021. Margaret Brooke was delivered on July 15, 2021 and commissioned on October 28, 2022. The two Coast Guard AOPS variants (ships seven and eight) were expected to begin construction in 2022 and 2023. In January 2023, it was announced that work on the additional ships would begin in the course of 2023.

Potable water contamination 
In December 2022, it was discovered that the potable water systems of all the delivered and launched ships had suspected lead contamination from fittings and valves that were manufactured from alloys that exceeded the allowable amount of lead. The ships affected by the contamination were Harry DeWolf, Margaret Brooke, and Max Bernays. William Hall would be tested for the contamination after the completion of construction.

Criticism
The Harry DeWolf class has been criticized for its design and effectiveness, as critics believe that the class is ineffective in its designated role of arctic and offshore patrol. Some criticism focuses on the fact that the ships are slow and, compared to the similarly sized Russian Project 23550 patrol ships armed with 3M-54 Kalibr anti-ship missiles, underarmed. However, others believe that the ships' capabilities are sufficient given their largely constabulary mission, and are in line with existing naval and coast guard vessels of other arctic nations.

In April 2013, the Rideau Institute and the Canadian Centre for Policy Alternatives released a report on the proposed AOPS. The report was written by UBC Professor Michael Byers and Stewart Webb. The report's conclusion was that Canada would be better suited to have purpose-built ships, namely icebreakers for the Arctic and offshore patrol vessels for the Pacific and Atlantic coasts.

In May 2013, the CBC reported that the cost of the design phase of the project was many times what other countries paid for design, construction, and full-up operational deployment of similar ships. The projected design cost of the AOPS, $288 million, was compared primarily to the Norwegian icebreaking offshore patrol vessel Svalbard that was designed and built for less than $100 million in 2002, and whose basic design documentation package was purchased by Canada for $5 million. Shipbuilding experts interviewed by CBC estimated that the design cost of the AOPS should have been $10–20 million even if accounting for cost of adapting the Norwegian design to Canadian service. The $288 million design cost was further compared to two European offshore patrol vessel classes that, while significantly cheaper to design and build, have only one third of the AOPS' displacement. Furthermore, the Danish  has much lower ice-going capability than the AOPS and the Irish  is not ice-capable at all.

Design

The vessels' design was initially intended to incorporate a conventional icebreaking bow for cruising, and would have proceeded backwards for breaking heavy ice.  The vessels' stern would have been designed for ice breaking and they would have employed azimuth thrusters for propulsion and for chewing through resistant ice.  However, due to cost constraints, a conventional bow-first design was chosen for both light and heavy icebreaking. The propulsion would be provided by diesel-electric twin shafts with bolt-on propellers, similar to existing Canadian Coast Guard icebreakers. The vessels' ice class is Polar Class 5, but the bow region is further strengthened to higher Polar Class 4 level.

In 2008, a contract was awarded to BMT Fleet Technology and STX Canada Marine to assist in developing technical specifications and a design for the project. The technical specifications were to be used to draft a request for proposals. The government later awarded a design contract to BMT Fleet Technology and STX Canada Marine to develop the design of the vessel for issue to the selected NSPS proponent.

The ships are built in three large mega blocks: centre, aft and bow. Each mega block consists of 62 smaller building blocks. The first steel was cut on Harry DeWolf in September 2015.

The ships are designed to displace , making it the largest class of naval vessels produced in Canada in the past 50 years with the previous being the retired . They are capable of outfitting multiple payload options such as shipping containers, underwater survey equipment, or a landing craft. The vessels have a  crane to self-load/unload, and a vehicle bay to carry vehicles for deployment over the ice. The design also calls for an enclosed cable deck and forecastle to better cope with the Arctic environment. On the open sea, the ship has fin stabilizers to reduce roll that are retractable during ice operations.

Armament and aircraft

In August 2015, BAE Systems won the contract to provide up to six modified Mk 38 Mod 2 25 mm cannon for the naval ships in the class (the coast guard ships will be unarmed, as CCG has no enforcement mandate). This contract also covers the service life of the weapons.

The vessels have a hangar and flight deck capable of employing and maintaining the same maritime helicopters as the RCN's other vessels: the CH-148 Cyclone and the CH-149 Cormorant.

Bridge and navigation system 
In 2014 OSI Maritime Systems Ltd. was selected by Lockheed Martin Canada to design the integrated bridge and navigation system for the AOPS program, this was followed by a contract for the Implementation Phase in 2015. Since, OSI has built and installed all AOPS Integrated Bridge and Navigation ship sets.

Propulsion and power

The vessels have a diesel-electric powertrain with four  MAN 6L32/44CR four-stroke medium-speed diesel generators producing electricity for two  propulsion motors.

Sensors
In September 2015, it was announced that the ships would be outfitted with SAGEM BlueNaute navigational systems. On 7 October 2015, Thales IFF system was selected for use on the class. Terma currently provides its SCANTER 6002 radar system to Lockheed Martin Canada as part of the Combat Management System (CMS 330), which was selected by Irving Shipbuilding Inc. for the AOPS.

Canadian Coast Guard version
The Canadian Coast Guard version will be built to a slightly modified design. Modifications include a new bridge layout and accommodations for a non-military crew subject to Transport Canada requirements. Some areas are to be changed to meet the needs of coast guard equipment and there will be modifications to the deck. Despite the supposedly limited modifications, the cost of the two Coast Guard variants was reported in 2022 as likely to be significantly higher than that of the naval variants. In 2023, it was reported that the cost of the two Coast Guard variants had increased by a further $100 million, going from $1.5 billion to $1.6 billion.

Ships in class
Italics indicate estimated dates

Possible additional roles
As the Harry Dewolf-class ships started to enter service, comments appeared in Canadian professional military journals suggesting that they might be useful as small amphibious ships carrying up to 50 to 60 soldiers/marine infantry into the Arctic.

See also
 Nanisivik Naval Facility

References

 
Proposed ships of the Royal Canadian Navy
Canadian defence procurement